The Roman Catholic Diocese of Fontibón is a diocese located in the city of Fontibón in the Ecclesiastical province of Bogotá in Colombia.

History
 6 August 2003: Established as Diocese of Fontibón from Metropolitan Archdiocese of Bogotá

Ordinaries
Enrique Sarmiento Angulo (2003.08.06 – 2011.11.25)
Juan Vicente Cordoba Villota, S.J. (2011.11.25 – present)

See also
Roman Catholicism in Colombia

Sources

External links
 Catholic Hierarchy
 GCatholic.org

Roman Catholic dioceses in Colombia
Roman Catholic Ecclesiastical Province of Bogotá
Christian organizations established in 2003
Roman Catholic dioceses and prelatures established in the 21st century